Typhoon Wilda was an intense typhoon that was tied for lowest central pressure of any typhoon in 1964, along with Typhoon Sally. As the twenty-fourth named storm of the season, it origins can be traced back to when it was as a tropical storm east-southeast of Guam on September 16. Wilda moved northwestward for multiple days. it was identified as a tropical storm by Joint Typhoon Warning Center on September 19, strengthening into a typhoon that day. It reached its peak intensity over the Philippine Sea. Wilda slightly weakened following peak strength before curving northward and making landfall on September 24. The storm would eventually emerge into the Sea of Japan and curve northeast. Wilda made a final landfall on September 25 as a tropical storm, thereafter, departing Japan and quickly moving towards the central Aleutian Islands as a powerful extratropical cyclone, dissipating on September 27.

Meteorological history 

According to data from the Japan Meteorological Agency, Wilda began as a tropical storm east-southeast of Guam on September 16, marked by a large mass of clouds and associated rainbands. The system tracked northwest over the Northern Mariana Islands and into the Philippine Sea two days later. Based on data from the JMA, this was tied for lowest central pressure of any typhoon in 1964, along with Typhoon Sally. Wilda slightly weakened following peak strength before curving northward and making landfall on Kagoshima on September 24; one-minute sustained winds three hours prior to landfall were estimated to be . The storm passed over Shikoku and southern Honshu before emerging into the Sea of Japan and curving northeast. Wilda made a final landfall on the western coast of northern Honshu on September 25 as a tropical storm, thereafter, departing Japan and quickly moving towards the central Aleutian Islands as a powerful extratropical cyclone. The storm was last identified on September 27.

Preparations and impact 
Wilda was one of the strongest typhoons to ever strike Japan as measured by atmospheric pressure, reaching Cape Sata in Kagoshima with a central pressure of 940 hPa (mbar; 27.76 inHg). The typhoon caused 47 fatalities and 530 injuries in Japan. Over 70,000 homes were destroyed and nearly 45,000 were inundated by the typhoon across the country, leaving thousands of people homeless. The southern and eastern coasts of Kyushu, the southern coast of Shikoku, and Hyōgo Prefecture experienced the highest proportion of destroyed homes per capita. At least 64 ships were sunk with another 192 damaged or lost. Damage was widespread in the northern Ryukyu Islands. Banana, sugar cane, and vegetable fields in Amami Ōshima were badly damaged, along with roofs and windows. Naze lost power during the storm. Wilda brought  waves to southern Kyushu. One British freighter ran aground off Kagoshima and broke into two; all 41 crew were rescued. The widespread flooding in the region overtopped dikes and disrupted air and rail traffic. An 8,547-ton Indonesian freighter with 53 crew ran aground and keeled over at the Port of Kobe. Gale-force winds from Wilda reached the Tokyo area, damaging roofs at the Tokyo Olympic Village and uprooting trees two weeks before the start of the 1964 Summer Olympics.

See also 

 Typhoon Vera (1959) – an intense and deadly typhoon that was also known as the Isewan Typhoon.
 Typhoon Chaba (2004) – an intense typhoon that took a comparable track.
 Typhoon Songda (2004) – another intense typhoon that affected similar areas, not long after Chaba did.
 Typhoon Jebi (2018) – the costliest typhoon in Japan's history in terms of insured losses.
 Typhoon Krosa (2019)  – a typhoon that took a nearly identical track.

References 

Typhoons in Japan